Africa United may refer to:

 Africa United (2010 film), a film by Deborah Gardner-Paterson
 Africa United (2005 film), a film by Olaf de Fleur Johannesson